So Damn Happy is the thirty-fifth studio album by American singer Aretha Franklin. Her first studio album in five years, it included the Grammy Award-winning track "Wonderful", the single co-written and produced by Ron "Amen-Ra" Lawrence, his very first project with the Queen of Soul was a grand slam. The album peaked at number 33 on the US Billboard 200 and number 11 on the Top R&B/Hip-Hop Albums chart, while reaching the top thirty of the Italian Albums Chart. Shortly after its release, Franklin left Arista after a stay of 23 years. She later announced plans to start her own Detroit-based record label, Aretha Records.

Background
In 1998, Franklin released her thirty-fourth studio album A Rose Is Still a Rose. A breakaway from the adult contemporary sound of her previous releases, it saw her collaborating with many famed hip hop producers and rappers such as Lauryn Hill, Sean "Puffy" Combs, and Jermaine Dupri, and took her work further into the hip hop and modern-day R&B genre. The album went gold in the US and was praised by most critics, who called it a return to form for Franklin. Following the departure of Arista Records head and longtime collaborator Clive Davis in 2000, L.A. Reid became instrumental in compiling Franklin's next project with the label. He chose songs to honor Franklin's roots, making no attempt to realize a pop record, instead aiming for a more personal, soulful vibe that would sound like "the old days." Franklin wrote and produced three songs on So Damn Happy, accompanied herself on the piano and was more generally hands-on than she had been on her other recent albums, which she cited as "the missing element." Elaborating on the overall sound of the album, she added: "Some of it is hip-hop, some of it is traditional, and it just works."

Critical reception

So Damn Happy received generally mixed to positive reviews from music critics. Allmusic editor Jon Bush called the album "a refreshing (though admittedly sterilized) update of her '70s records [...] composed of earthy, acoustic-driven soul, similar to contemporary records by India.Arie or Jill Scott." He felt that "the songs on So Damn Happy are all the proof her fans need to understand that her talent remains undiminished nearly 50 years after her debut as a secular act." People magazine noted that Franklin "may be worshiped for her oldies, but the Queen of Soul’s new material also deserves respect." The magazine found that the "entire album, refreshingly free of any guest rappers or trendy production, has a warm, classic R&B feel. Even Franklin’s two jazz-kissed collaborations with hip-hop soul diva Mary J. Blige sound as if they could have been recorded in the '70s."

In his review for MSN Music, Jack Smith wrote that "Aretha's voice is a beautiful instrument that she never stops strengthening and developing and in So Damn Happy her legion of fans have a slick and superior album of depth, vision and soul that's truly one to savour." Billboard found that "Franklin revisits the contemporary production well that she drew from for" previous album A Rose Is Still a Rose, noting that "unlike that album – which had its stellar moments – Happy is a more consistent package [...] striking a believable balance between new-school vibe and down-home soul." Rolling Stone journalist Barry Walters compared the album unfavorably to A Rose Is Still a Rose and wrote that "The queen of soul is still the Queen. But that doesn’t mean the material on Aretha Franklin’s latest album is deserving of her crown." He found that the songs came up "short in the melody, hook and rhythm departments," providing "adult-contemporary slickness that sometimes makes the sixty-one-year-old legend’s voice seem shrill."

Chart performance
In the United States, So Damn Happy debuted and peaked at number 33 on the US Billboard 200 and number 11 on the US Top R&B/Hip-Hop Albums, with first week sales of 28,000 copies. Franklin scored her best career sales frame in the album's third week on the charts, when it shifted 27,000 copies in the week ending October 5, 2003, though this mark was later surpassed by her 2014 album Aretha Franklin Sings the Great Diva Classics. As of 2012, So Damn Happy sold 304,000 copies in the US, according to Nielsen SoundScan. Elsewhere, the album failed to chart on most music markets, though it reached number 28 on the Italian Albums Chart, ranking among her highest-charting albums there.

Track listing

Samples
"Holdin On'" contains excerpts from "The Sponge," written by Earl Klugh.

Personnel

Adi Yeshaya – strings, arranger, conductor, horn, keyboards, horn arrangements
Alexander Vselensky – violin
Alfred Brown – viola
Allen Sides – engineer, mixing
Andy Stein – violin
Anthony Kadleck – trumpet
Anthony Posk – violin
Aretha Franklin – piano, vocals, backing vocals, producer, engineer, mixing
B.J. – handclapping
Barbara Wesotski – A&R
Barry Eastmond – arranger, keyboards, producer, engineer
Belinda Whitney – violin
Birch Johnson – trombone
Bobby Ross Avila – guitar, keyboards
Brenda Corbett – backing vocals
Burt Bacharach – rhythm, producer, string arrangements
Byung Kook Kwak – violin
Carl Robinson – engineer, assistant
Cenovia Cummins – violin
Charles "Prince Cha... – mixing
Cindy Mizelle – backing vocals
Dan Oniszczak – assistant engineer
Darryl Houston – organ
David Chase – digital editing
David Foster – synthesizer strings
Delant "Butta" Murphy – handclapping
EMI Ferguson – digital editing
Eugene J. Moye – cello
George Flynn – trombone
Gerald Tarack – violin
Gloria Agostini – harp
Gordon Chambers – backing vocals, producer, vocal arrangement
Greg Phillinganes – digital editing
Israel Chorberg – violin
Iz – drum programming
James "Big Jim" Wright – keyboards, producer
Jean-Marie Horvat – mixing
Jeff Burns – assistant
Jesse Levy – cello, orchestra contractor
Jimmy Jam – producer
JoAnn Tominaga – production coordination
Joe-Mama Nitzberg – creative director
Joey Arbagey – A&R
Joyce Hammann – violin
Karen Karlsrud – violin
Keith O'Quinn – trombone
Keith Slattery – assistant
Kenneth Burward-Hoy – viola
Kenya Lucas – handclapping
Kermit Moore – cello
Kwaku Alston – photography
L.A. Reid – executive producer
Leo Grinhauz – cello
Lew Soloff – trumpet
Louis Alfred III – engineer
Margeret Th. Hjalte... – viola
Mary J. Blige – backing vocals, vocal arrangement, melodie, handclapping
Michael Baker – strings, horn
Michael Hart Thompson – guitar
Michael J. Powell – engineer, mixing
Mildred Scott – backing vocals
Myiia "Sunny" Davis – backing vocals
Nate Neblett – drums
Neil Stubenhaus – bass guitar
Norman West – synthesizer, bass guitar, piano, keyboards, producer, engineer, mixing
Olivia Koppell – violin, viola
Pablo Arraya – assistant
Paulinho Da Costa – percussion
Perry Hughes – guitar
Ralphe Armstrong – bass guitar
Randy Brecker – trumpet
Regine Lambert – handclapping
Regis Iandiorio – violin
Richard Thomas Jenn... – art direction, design
Rick Williams – guitar
Ricky Lawson – drums
Rob Shrock – synthesizer arrangements
Robert Chausow – violin
Roger Wendt – French horn
Ron "Amen-Ra" Lawrence – keyboards, multi instruments, producer, engineer, drum programming
Rowie Nomeri – engineer
Sandra Dance – backing vocals
Sara Divine – backing vocals
Sharon Moe – French horn
Sheila Reinhold – violin
Shelly Ponder – backing vocals
Steve Pageot – engineer
Susan Heerema – violin
Terry Lewis – producer
Tom Coyne – mastering
Tom Sweeney – assistant
Tommy Morgan – harmonica, soloist
Tommy Wilber – assistant
Troy Taylor – bass guitar, drums, keyboards, programming, backing vocals, multi instruments, producer, vocal editing
Vernon D. Fails – Fender Rhodes
William Bush – arranger, keyboards, drum programming
Winterton Garvey – violin

Charts

Weekly charts

Year-end charts

References

2003 albums
Aretha Franklin albums
Arista Records albums
Albums produced by Troy Taylor (record producer)